Schilling is a German surname. Notable people with the surname include:
Anne Schilling, American mathematician
August "Gus" Schilling (1908–1957), American film actor
Bobby Schilling (1964–2021), U.S. Republican politician from Illinois
Christian Schwarz-Schilling (born 1930), German politician
Claus Schilling (1871–1946), German experimenter in Nazi human concentration camp experiments executed for war crimes
Curt Schilling (born 1966), American Major League Baseball player
David C. Schilling (1918–1956), American military officer
Francis X. Schilling (1868–1949), American farmer and politician
Frank Schilling (born 1969), internet investor
Friedrich Schilling (mathematician) (1858–1960), German mathematician 
Hans Schilling (aviator) (1892–1916), German flying ace
Harry W. Schilling (1887–1958), American farmer and politician
Jeffrey Schilling, American hostage captured by Abu Sayyaf
 Jerry Schilling (born 1942), American talent manager. A member of Elvis Presley's Memphis Mafia
Joe Schilling (born 1984), American kickboxer
Pavel Schilling (1786–1837), Estonian-German Russian diplomat
Peter Schilling (born 1956), German synthpop musician
Reinhard Schwarz-Schilling (1904–1985), German composer
Robert Schilling (historian) (1913–2004), French scholar
Samuel Peter Schilling (1773–1852) German entomologist
Taylor Schilling (born 1984), American actress
Walter Schilling (1895–1943), German general
Warner R. Schilling (1925–2013), American political scientist and international relations scholar
William G. Schilling (1939–2019), American actor (Head of the Class)

German-language surnames
Surnames from nicknames